Pachyteria dimidiata, the mimusop stem borer, is a species of round-necked longhorn beetle of the subfamily Cerambycinae.

Description
Body is shining bluish-black, with a broad yellow band nearly across the middle of the elytra and yellow six terminal joints of the hooked antennae. Length of antennae is about equal to the body. This wood boring species is considered a pest on ornamental and fruit trees, especially on the ironwood tree (Mimusops elengi).

Distribution
This species can be found in China, India, Iran, Laos, Malaysia, Sumatra, Thailand and Vietnam.

References
 Biolib
 Worldwide Cerambycoidea Photo Gallery
 Whatsthatbug
 Charles Joseph Gahan.  Coleoptera: Cerambycidae (Volume 1)

Callichromatini
Beetles described in 1848